Manchuela is a Spanish Denominación de Origen Protegida (DOP) for wines located in the historical Manchuela comarca, in the east of the provinces of Albacete and Cuenca (Castile-La Mancha, Spain) between the valleys of the Rivers Júcar and Cabriel. It was originally part of a much larger La Mancha DOP and became a separate DOP in 2004. It is surrounded on three sides by other DOPs: La Mancha to the west, Utiel-Requena to the east and Jumilla to the south.

History
La Manchuela DOP is the seventh DOP to be created in the region of Castile-La Mancha. It includes over seventy municipalities, including Albacete itself and Motilla del Palancar in Cuenca.

Climate
The climate is continental (long hot dry summers, cold winters) influenced by the nocturnal moisture bearing winds from the Levant, which help keep the mean annual temperature down to 25°C. Temperatures in winter rarely fall low enough to cause frost. Humidity is very low and virtually no rainfall between the months of May and September.

Soil
The soil is lime-bearing clay and the vineyards are at an altitude of 600 – 700 m above sea level. There are two large reservoirs just to the north of the area which are used for irrigation of the vines.

Authorised Grape Varieties
The authorised grape varieties are:
 Red: Monastrell, Cencibel, Garnacha Tintorera, Garnacha, Cabernet Sauvignon, Merlot, Syrah, Petit Verdot, Cabernet Franc, Frasco, Graciano, Malbec, Mazuelo, Moravia Agria, Moravia Dulce, Pinot Noir, and Rojal

 White: Albillo, Chardonnay, Macabeo, Moscatel de Grano Menudo, Pardillo, Sauvignon Blanc, Verdejo, and Viognier

References

External links
 D.O.P. Manchuela official website

Wine regions of Spain